Alhassan Ado Garba popularly known as Alhassan Doguwa (born August 14, 1965) is the Majority Leader of House of Representatives of Nigeria. He is an All Progressive Congress (APC) member representing Doguwa/Tudun Wada Federal Constituency of Kano State.

Early life and education
Born on 14 August 1965 from a Hausa political family. Alhassan Ado is a son of a prominent member of the First Republic NEPU, and a Kano-based political party that later joined the United Progressive Grand Alliance (UPGA), which formed a strong formidable national opposition to the then leading Northern People’s Congress (NPC). Hon Garba's father, Alhaji Ado was elected an Honorable Member, Kano State House of Assembly under the defunct Peoples Redemption Party (PRP) Government.

Alhassan Ado Garba was a First Class Graduate of Mass Communications from Bayero University Kano, a focused personality who joined politics immediately after graduating and became elected member of the House of Representatives under the defunct SDP in 1992, it did not take him long to register his presence in the House. He was one of the frontline Members that supported Engr. Dr. Rabiu Musa Kwankwaso to become the Deputy Speaker of the 3rd Republic House of Representatives.

Political career
Alhassan Ado Garba was first elected to the Nigerian National Assembly's House of Representatives under the defunct SDP in 1992. He was one of the frontline Members that supported the election of Engr. Rabiu Musa Kwankwaso to become the Deputy Speaker of the 3rd Republic House of Representatives.

In 2000, Alhassan Ado Garba was appointed as Special Adviser to the Kano State Governor on Environment. He later worked as a Special Adviser on Governmental Affairs and Political Party Affairs to Senate Presidents Chief Adolphus Wabara and Senator Ken Nnamani respectively.

Hon Alhassan Ado succeeded in returning to the House of Representatives in 2007 where he became the Deputy Chairman of the House Committee on Niger Delta Development Commission (NDDC). Having served the nation and especially his constituents diligently, the enterprising people of Tudun Wada/Doguwa Federal Constituency re-elected Hon Doguwa in 2011 where it became more clearly that he is indeed a Parliamentary asset having served as the Chairman House Committee chairman on MDGs. Hon Alhassan also serves as the African Network of Parliamentarians on MDGs Chairman.

In 2015, Garba was elected to serve for the fourth term in the Lower Chamber where he was overwhelmingly elected as the 8th Assembly's Chief Whip after the defeat of his Speakership nominee (Femi Gbajabiamila) who lost to Yakubu Dogara. Upon his acceptance as the Chief Whip however created a rift between him and Femi Gbajabiamila something that tear their team apart and ends their long relationship.

Family Life

Alhassan Ado Garba is a firm believer in large family, he has four wives and 28 children.

Honours and awards
Alhassan Ado Garba has a Traditional Title of Sarkin Yakin Burum Burum and Yariman Dadin Kowa conferred to him by both theDistrict Heads of Doguwa and Tudun Wada Local Governments respectively in 2013. He was also conferred of the prestigious national honour of the (OON) in October 2022, by His Excellency, Muhammadu Buhari, GCON, President of the Federal Republic of Nigeria.

References

Members of the House of Representatives (Nigeria)
Politicians from Kano State
Living people
1965 births
All Progressives Congress politicians
Nigerian Muslims
Hausa people
People from Kano State